Tarbor-e Sadat (also Romanized as Tarbor-e Sādāt and Tarbor Sādāt; also known as Tarboré Sadat and Tarbor-e Seyyedhā) is a village in Darian Rural District, in the Central District of Shiraz County, Fars Province, Iran. At the 2006 census, its population was 421, in 117 families.

References 

Populated places in Shiraz County